William Walter Doar, Jr. (born March 9, 1935) was an American politician in the state of South Carolina. He served in the South Carolina Senate as a member of the Democratic Party from 1972 to 1988 and in the South Carolina House of Representatives from 1966 to 1972, representing Georgetown County, South Carolina. He is a lawyer.

References

1935 births
Living people
Democratic Party members of the South Carolina House of Representatives
Democratic Party South Carolina state senators
People from Rock Hill, South Carolina
South Carolina lawyers